Xiangdong District is one of two districts of Pingxiang, Jiangxi province, China, bordering Hunan province to the west.

Administrative divisions
Xiangdong District is divided to 1 subdistrict, 8 towns and 2 townships.
1 subdistrict
 Xiashankou

8 towns

2 townships
 Guanghansai
 Baizhu

References

External links
  Government site - 

Xiangdong